Peggy King (born February 16, 1930) is a jazz vocalist and television personality. She was a member of big bands led by Charlie Spivak, Ralph Flanagan, and Ray Anthony.

Career
"Pretty Perky Peggy King", as she was called, appeared on The George Gobel Show from 1954 through 1957 and guest-starred on many other TV shows, including Bob Hope's 1956 Chevy Show, American Bandstand, Maverick, Dragnet (series), The Steve Allen Show, The Kraft Music Hall with Milton Berle, What's My Line?, The Tonight Show Starring Johnny Carson, The Perry Como Show, The Garry Moore Show, and The Jack Benny Program.

In 1952, MGM signed her to a contract, which led to a singing cameo in Vincente Minnelli's The Bad and the Beautiful (recorded with Skip Martin for MGM Records) and a series of commercial jingles for Hunt's tomato sauce. These last brought her to the attention of Mitch Miller at Columbia Records. Miller signed her to a long-term contract, under which she made two best-selling albums, Wish Upon on a Star and Girl Meets Boy  and a string of hit singles, including "Make Yourself Comfortable" in 1954. She sang the Oscar-nominated song "Count Your Blessings" on the 1955 Academy Awards telecast, and both Billboard and Down Beat magazine named her Best New Singer of 1955–56.

King sang in the 1955 comedy Abbott and Costello Meet the Mummy and was featured as chief co-star on the poster. She portrayed the stewardess Janet Turner in the suspense thriller Zero Hour! (1957), later the basis for the satirical comedy Airplane!. She starred opposite Tab Hunter in the television musical Hans Brinker, or The Silver Skates (1958) and in a musical version of Jack and the Beanstalk co-starring Joel Grey, Celeste Holm, and Cyril Ritchard. Her albums include Lazy Afternoon (1959), Oh What a Memory We Made Tonight, and Peggy King Sings Jerome Kern. In 2008 Sepia Records reissued the original cast album of Hans Brinker, or The Silver Skates, adding sixteen of King's Columbia recordings and four of Hunter's. In 2016, Fresh Sound released her first new album in 36 years.

The Broadcast Pioneers of Philadelphia inducted King into their Hall of Fame in 2010. The success of the movie led to her resuming her singing career in 2013 with the All-Star Jazz Trio, and she received strong notices at 54 Below in New York and the Metropolitan Room. King continues to perform in nightclubs, theatres and at charitable and private events on a regular basis, with Music Director/Pianist Andrew Kahn and accompanied by The All-Star Jazz Trio.

On February 8, 1960, King became one of the first stars to be honored on the Hollywood Walk of Fame. Her star is located on the north side of the 6500 block of Hollywood Boulevard.

Family 
Peggy was born February 16, 1930, to Floyd Henry King (1902–1978) and Mary Margaret Finan (1908–2001). She has been married three times. She first married trumpeter-trombonist Knobby Lee (né) Norbert William Francis Lidrbauch; 1927–1999) on February 2, 1953, in Los Angeles County. She met Lee while singing with Ralph Flanagan. Lee had been a trumpeter with the band. Knobby and Peggy divorced October 19, 1956, in Los Angeles County. After ending a two-year engagement to Andre Previn in 1958, she married Bill Kirkpatrick (ne William Kirkpatrick) in 1959. At the time, Kirkpatrick was a publicist with Bill Doll (1910–1979). Then, in the early 1960s, she married Samuel Rudofker (1921–1994) of Philadelphia, with whom she has two children, Jonathan King Rudofker (1962–2000) and Suzanne Rudofker (born 1963), and a granddaughter, Haley Rudofker (born 2000). Tabloids and biographies suggest that she had once had a love interest with Sammy Davis, Jr.

References

External links
 Broadcast Pioneers of Philadelphia website
 Peggy King internet radio show on WYYR.com

1930 births
Living people
Jazz musicians from Pennsylvania
People from Greensburg, Pennsylvania
Singers from Pennsylvania
20th-century American women singers
American women pop singers
American women jazz singers
American jazz singers
Big band singers
Blues singers
Swing singers
Torch singers
Traditional pop music singers
RCA Victor artists
20th-century American singers
21st-century American women